The .297/250 Rook is an obsolete centerfire rifle cartridge developed by Holland & Holland.

Overview
The .297/250 Rook is a bottlenecked rimmed cartridge originally designed for use in rook rifles for hunting small game and target shooting.

This cartridge is a contemporary of the .255 Jeffery Rook and upon their release the pair competed heavily with the very popular .300 Rook.

As with other rook rifle cartridges, the .297/250 Rook was superseded by the .22 Long Rifle.

Dimensions

See also
Rook rifle
List of rifle cartridges
6 mm rifle cartridges

References

Footnotes

Bibliography
 Barnes, Frank C., Cartridges of the World, 15th ed, Iola: Gun Digest Books, 2016, .
 Cartridgecollector, ".300 Rook target", cartridgecollector.net, retrieved 22 April 2017.
 Imperial War Museums, "6.35 x 20.5R : Kynoch ; .297/.250 Rook Rifle", iwm.org.uk, retrieved 22 April 2017.
 Imperial War Museums, "7.62 x 29.5R : Kynoch ; .300 Rook Rifle & .295 Rook Rifle", iwm.org.uk, retrieved 22 April 2017.
 Sharp, Henry, Modern sporting gunnery: A manual of practical information for shooters of today, London: Simpkin, Marshall, Hamilton, Kent & Co. Ltd, 1906.

External links
 Ammo-One, ".297/250 Rook", ammo-one.com , retrieved 22 April 2017.
 Cartridgecollector, "297/250 Rook Rifle", cartridgecollector.net, retrieved 22 April 2017.

Pistol and rifle cartridges
British firearm cartridges
Rook rifle cartridges
Holland & Holland cartridges